The Dragon Bridge is a bridge over the River Hàn at Da Nang, Vietnam.

Construction of the bridge began on 19 July 2009 (the same day as the inauguration of the nearby Thuận Phước Bridge) when the former Prime Minister of Vietnam Nguyen Tan Dung and many high-ranking government officials attended the groundbreaking ceremony.

Dragon Bridge is 666m long, 37.5m wide and has six lanes for traffic. It opened to traffic on March 29, 2013, at a cost of nearly VND 1.5 trillion dong (US$88m). The bridge was designed by the US-based Ammann & Whitney Consulting Engineers with Louis Berger Group. Construction was undertaken by Company No. 508, an affiliate of Civil Construction Engineering Corporation No.5, and Bridge Company No. 75.

The main span was completed on October 26, 2012. The bridge was opened to traffic on March 29, 2013, the 38th anniversary of the capture of Da Nang City by North Vietnamese forces (known as the Liberation of Da Nang in Vietnam) during the Vietnam War (known as the American War in Vietnam).

This modern bridge crosses the Han River at the Le Dinh Duong/Bach Dang traffic circle, providing the shortest road link from the Da Nang International Airport to other main roads in Da Nang city, and a more direct route to My Khe Beach and Non Nuoc Beach on the eastern edge of the city. The bridge was designed and built in the shape of a dragon and to breathe fire and water each Friday, Saturday and Sunday night at 9 pm.

See also 
 Han River Bridge
 Thuận Phước Bridge
 Trần Thị Lý Bridge

References

External links
 "Dragon Bridge, Vietnam" at roadtraffic-technology webpage
 "Dragon Bridge, Vietnam" at the Berger Group webpage

 Google Earth view

Road bridges in Vietnam
Bridges in Da Nang
Bridges completed in 2013
Tourist attractions in Da Nang
Sculptures of dragons